Huang Huai-hsuan (born 7 July 1997) is a Taiwanese taekwondo athlete.

She competed at the 2016 Summer Olympics in Rio de Janeiro, in the women's 49 kg.

References

External links

1997 births
Living people
Taiwanese female taekwondo practitioners
Olympic taekwondo practitioners of Taiwan
Taekwondo practitioners at the 2016 Summer Olympics
Taekwondo practitioners at the 2014 Summer Youth Olympics
Youth Olympic gold medalists for Chinese Taipei
21st-century Taiwanese women